Gregory Kevin "Bo" Kimble (born April 9, 1966) is an American former professional basketball player in the National Basketball Association (NBA). He played college basketball for the Loyola Marymount Lions. As a senior in the 1989–90 season, Kimble was named a consensus second-team All-American as well as the conference player of the year in the West Coast Conference (WCC). He led the 11th-seeded Lions to the regional finals of the NCAA tournament after the death of teammate Hank Gathers. Kimble was selected by the Los Angeles Clippers in the first round of the 1990 NBA draft with the eighth overall pick. He played three seasons in the NBA with the Clippers and the New York Knicks.

High school
Kimble played prep ball with Hank Gathers at Dobbins Technical High School in Philadelphia, with the pair leading the team to the Public League City championship in 1985.

College

USC
Both Gathers and Kimble were recruited to the University of Southern California by head coach Stan Morrison and his top assistant, David Spencer. They were joined by high school All-American, Tom Lewis, and Rich Grande as the "Four Freshmen" star recruiting class. Following an 11-17 season coaching USC, Morrison and Spencer were fired after the 1985-86 season was over, despite winning the Pac-10 the previous year. It was reported that the players would not remain unless certain conditions were met, including having a say in the next coaching staff. USC hired George Raveling as the next head coach of the Trojans. Raveling gave the players a deadline to respond whether they would remain on the team. When they did not respond, he revoked the scholarships of Gathers, Kimble, and Lewis. Raveling's controversial statement was, "You can't let the Indians run the reservation." "You've got to be strong, too. Sometimes you have to tell them that they have to exit," he said. Kimble and Gathers transferred together from USC to Loyola Marymount University (LMU). Lewis transferred to Pepperdine. Grande remained at USC.

Loyola Marymount
After sitting out the 1986–87 season as required under NCAA rules for transfer students, the pair became the centerpiece of arguably the most entertaining college team in history. The Lions' then-coach Paul Westhead installed an extraordinarily fast-paced game plan. On offense, LMU typically took shots within 10 seconds of gaining possession, with many of the shots being three-pointers. The Lions' defense was a full-court press designed to force opponents into a frenzied up-and-down game. Kimble led the nation in scoring in 1990 averaging 35.3 points per game, and he was also a consensus second team All-American selection that year. Kimble's teams led Division I in scoring in 1988 (110.3 points per game), 1989 (112.5), and 1990 (122.4). LMU's 122.4 point per game in 1990 was still a record as of March 2019. As of October 2010, Loyola Marymount held the five highest combined score games in Division I history. Four of the five occurred during Kimble's career, including a record 331 in the 181–150 win over United States International University on January 31, 1989.

During the 1990 WCC tournament, Gathers collapsed and died of a heart condition in LMU's semifinal against Portland. As a result of Gathers's death, the tournament was suspended, and Loyola Marymount was given the league's automatic bid to the NCAA tournament (as a No. 11 seed) due to their regular season championship. During LMU's subsequent run to the Elite Eight, Kimble (who was right-handed), Gathers' friend and teammate, shot his first free throw of each game left-handed in memory of Gathers (although right-handed, he struggled so much with free throws that he tried shooting them left-handed for a time), making all three attempts (Kimble did not have any free-throw attempts in the Sweet 16 win over Alabama).

Kimble's No. 30 and Gathers's No. 44 were retired by LMU in a joint ceremony in 2000. In 2005, the entire 1989–90 team was inducted into Loyola Marymount's Hall of Fame.

NBA
Later that year, Kimble was selected by the Los Angeles Clippers with the 8th overall pick of the 1990 NBA Draft. At the time, the Clippers were playing in the Los Angeles Memorial Sports Arena, the same building that Kimble played in with Gathers while they were at USC. As a rookie, he averaged 6.9 points per game and for his career averaged 5.5 points per game while mostly sitting on the end of the bench. Kimble revealed in 2015 that getting very little playing time despite his ability while the Clippers floundered drove him to consider suicide several times. His NBA career was plagued by injuries. In the summer of 1992, Kimble was traded to the New York Knicks as part of a three-team, six-player deal that brought Mark Jackson to the Clippers. Kimble played only nine games for the Knicks, and was released at the end of the season, bringing his brief NBA career to an end.

Kimble played for several years in the Continental Basketball Association after his NBA career ended.  He played for the Rapid City Thrillers, La Crosse Bobcats, Hartford Hellcats and Yakima Sun Kings.

Personal life
He starred in the 1991 movie Heaven is a Playground as fictional high school student Matthew Lockhart. Kimble co-founded and sits on the board of directors of Forty-Four for Life Foundation, a non-profit organization involved in reducing cardiac related fatalities.

Los Angeles County declared July 17, 1990, "Bo Kimble Day" for "not only for his accomplishments on the court, but for providing a positive role model for Los Angeles' youth."

On March 7, 2011, Kimble traveled to Holland, Michigan, to meet with Fennville High School and Lawrence High School's varsity basketball team. Fennville had just lost their star player, Wes Leonard, after he collapsed and died moments after hitting the winning shot in the team's 57-55 overtime victory over Bridgman High School in the last game of the regular season. Leonard's death, caused by cardiac arrest due to an enlarged heart, occurred one day shy of the 21st anniversary of Hank Gathers' death.

Notes

References

External links
Bo Kimble's stats at Basketball-Reference.com
Sports-Reference.com CBB boxscore for the 1990 LMU vs. Alabama game
LMU Men's Basketball History 1989-90 Elite Eight Team
NBA Draft Busts #8 at SI.com
Forty-Four for Life Foundation

1966 births
Living people
20th-century African-American sportspeople
21st-century African-American people
African-American basketball players
All-American college men's basketball players
American expatriate basketball people in France
American men's basketball players
Basketball players from Philadelphia
Basket CRO Lyon players
Hartford Hellcats players
La Crosse Bobcats players
Los Angeles Clippers draft picks
Los Angeles Clippers players
Loyola Marymount Lions men's basketball players
New York Knicks players
Rapid City Thrillers players
Shooting guards
USC Trojans men's basketball players
Yakima Sun Kings players